Charles Cospatrick Douglas-Home (1 September 1937 – 29 October 1985) was a Scottish journalist who served as editor of The Times from 1982 until his death.

Douglas-Home was the younger son of the Honourable Henry Douglas-Home (from his first marriage to Lady Margaret Spencer) and a nephew of the former British Prime Minister Alec Douglas-Home. Born in London, he was educated at Eton College (where he was a King's Scholar) and then went into the British Army in 1956 in the Royal Scots Greys. On leaving the Army he spent nine months in Canada, supporting himself by selling books and encyclopaedias. He then served as aide-de-camp to Sir Evelyn Baring who was Governor of Kenya, at the height of the Mau Mau insurgency. During that year (1958–9) Douglas-Home found his taste for international politics. He later wrote the biography Evelyn Baring: the Last Proconsul (1978).

When he returned to the UK he wanted to work in television but was quickly rejected because his accent and approach appeared wrong and he had no journalistic training. This led him to go into newspapers and he worked on the Scottish Daily Express covering breaking news. Douglas-Home found the work dull and was about to resign when the paper's proprietor, Beaverbrook Newspapers, promoted him to be the deputy to Chapman Pincher, the respected Defence correspondent of the Daily Express in London. This job was fascinating to Douglas-Home, and confirmed him in his career. Through his family connections, Douglas-Home built a network of contacts through parliament and Whitehall.

After eighteen months, Douglas-Home became the principal political and diplomatic correspondent of the Express. However he disagreed with the paper's opposition to British entry to the European Communities and with relief in 1965 was appointed to succeed Alun Gwynne-Jones as The Times defence correspondent. He covered the Six Days War and the Soviet invasion of Czechoslovakia. From 1970 he was features editor, and in 1973 he became home editor.

William Rees-Mogg was impressed with Douglas-Home's approach and made him foreign editor in 1978. He was a candidate for the editorship when Rupert Murdoch took over the paper in 1981, but Harold Evans was appointed instead with Douglas-Home as his deputy. However a year later Murdoch and Evans had a spectacular falling-out over editorial independence, and Douglas-Home succeeded the latter as editor. He would edit The Times from 1982 to his death in 1985.

Douglas-Home stabilised the paper, which he had inherited in a parlous state in the wake of its year long closure as well as the shock of the Harold Evans dismissal., and then began a steady process of improvement. Under his leadership The Times doubled its circulation to 500,000. Although firmly conservative in the editorial line of the paper's leaders, Douglas-Home was at the same time committed to the tradition of impartial news reporting. He continued to edit the paper with great courage through his long and painful illness.

He died of cancer at age 48, leaving a widow Jessica Gwynne and two sons Tara (born 1969) and Luke (born 1971). He was succeeded as editor by Charles Wilson.

The Charles Douglas-Home Memorial Trust Award was established in his honour to writers on the subjects of defence, foreign affairs, democracy, the royal prerogative in the 21st century, or music.

Ancestry

References

1937 births
1985 deaths
Anglo-Scots
Royal Scots Greys officers
Scottish journalists
Scottish newspaper editors
People educated at Eton College
The Times people